Thunder Rock is a 1939 play by Robert Ardrey.

The initial Broadway production, put on by the Group Theater and directed by Elia Kazan, closed after a short run, but the play was far more successful in wartime London. Thunder Rock became a symbol of British resistance and was the most notable play of World War II. It was first produced in a little-known theater in South Kensington but was transferred, with secret funding from Her Majesty's Treasury, to the Globe Theatre in London's West End.

Thunder Rock has seen many adaptations, including a BBC radio version in 1940 and a 1942 film starring Michael Redgrave and Barbara Mullen with James Mason in a minor role. In 1947 CBS broadcast a radio production; it was awarded a Peabody Award. Robert Ardrey reflected that "Thunder Rock was the only play I ever wrote that may be regarded as an international classic."

References

 Writer Biography: Robert Ardrey (primarily about the plays and screenplays)
 Wesleyan University Cinema Archives: The Elia Kazan Collection.
 The New York Times 1943 review of film version of Thunder Rock

External links

The Official Robert Ardrey Estate Website
Plays at the Robert Ardrey Estate Website

Plays by Robert Ardrey
1939 plays
Plays about World War II
American plays adapted into films
Works set in lighthouses